The Port Chicago Naval Magazine National Memorial is a memorial dedicated in 1994 recognizing the dead of the Port Chicago disaster, and the critical role played by Port Chicago, California during World War II, in serving as the main facility for the Pacific Theater of Operations. The national memorial is located at the Concord Naval Weapons Station near Concord, California, in the United States.

The 1944 Port Chicago disaster occurred at the naval magazine and resulted in the largest domestic loss of life during World War II. 320 sailors and civilians were instantly killed on July 17, 1944, when the ships they were loading with ammunition and bombs exploded. The majority of the deaths were African American sailors working for the racially segregated military. The explosion and its aftermath led to the largest Naval mutiny in US history, and it and the subsequent trial became major catalysts for the United States Navy to desegregate following the war.

History
The memorial was dedicated in 1994 and is located on the grounds of the Military Ocean Terminal Concord (MOTCO), formerly the Tidal Area of the Concord Naval Weapons Station. The memorial is only open to the public through reserved guided tours. On October 28, 2009, the Memorial became an official unit of the National Park System.

Plans
The Port Chicago Committee is working toward expanding the current memorial to encompass  of the former Port Chicago waterfront.  The memorial site could include some of the railroad revetments and old boxcars from the 1940s period, as well as the existing memorial chapel, with stained-glass windows depicting the World War II operations.

See also
 Other Navy memorials
 Rosie the Riveter/World War II Home Front National Historical Park
 List of national memorials of the United States

References

 The National Parks: Index 2001–2003. Washington: U.S. Department of the Interior.
 Press Release. Port Chicago Naval Magazine National Memorial Becomes 392nd Unit of National Park System

External links

 Official NPS website: Port Chicago Naval Magazine National Memorial
 Port Chicago Committee

African-American history in the San Francisco Bay Area
Buildings and structures in Concord, California
National Memorials of the United States
United States Navy
World War II memorials in the United States
Protected areas established in 1992
National Park Service areas in California
Labor monuments and memorials
Monuments and memorials in California
Protected areas of Contra Costa County, California
Military in the San Francisco Bay Area
Tourist attractions in Contra Costa County, California
Monuments and memorials on the National Register of Historic Places in California
1992 establishments in California